Jeremy Carver is an American television writer and producer. He developed the series Being Human (2011–2014), Frequency (2016–2017), and Doom Patrol (2019–present). Carver was also a writer and producer on the series Supernatural from 2007 to 2010 and 2012 to 2015, serving as showrunner during the eighth through eleventh seasons.

Personal life 
Carver is married to fellow television producer and writer Anna Fricke. Carver and Fricke worked as co-developers of Being Human together from 2011 to 2014.

Career 
Carver's career began in 2004 when he served as a consulting writer on the failed television pilot Fearless, based upon the series of novels by Francine Pascal. In 2006 he wrote an episode of the CBS series Waterfront, but the series was canceled before its premiere and Carver's episode never aired.

In 2007, Carver began work on Supernatural as a writer and story editor. He contributed twelve scripts over the next three years and became a co-producer during the show's fifth season but departed shortly afterwards to write and produce SyFy’s Being Human. Carver returned to Supernatural in 2012, following showrunner Sera Gamble’s departure. Carver acted as co-showrunner with executive producer Robert Singer from 2012 to 2016. At the end of the show’s eleventh season, Carver announced he was stepping down from his position.

In 2011, Carver served as the developer and co-showrunner for the North American remake of the series Being Human. Being Human ran for four seasons before its cancellation in 2014.

Following his departure as Supernatural’s showrunner, Carver acted as writer, developer, and executive producer for The CW series Frequency, a television adaption of the 2000 film by the same name. Frequency ran from 2016 to 2017.

In 2018, Carver was approached by DC Universe producers Greg Berlanti, Sarah Schechter and Geoff Johns to develop the planned DC Universe series Doom Patrol. Carver is currently serving as showrunner and executive producer for the show. Doom Patrol aired its first season in 2019.

Supernatural
 "Sin City" (October 25, 2007)
 "A Very Supernatural Christmas" (December 13, 2007)
 "Mystery Spot" (February 14, 2008)
 "Long Distance Call" (May 1, 2008)
 "In the Beginning" (October 2, 2008)
 "Family Remains" (January 15, 2009)
 "Death Takes a Holiday" (March 12, 2009)
 "The Rapture" (April 30, 2009)
 "Free to Be You and Me" (September 24, 2009)
 "Changing Channels" (November 5, 2009)
 "Dead Men Don't Wear Plaid" (March 25, 2010)
 "Point of No Return" (April 15, 2010)
 "We Need to Talk About Kevin" (October 3, 2012)
 "Sacrifice" (May 15, 2013)
 "I Think I'm Gonna Like It Here" (October 8, 2013)
 "Do You Believe in Miracles?" (May 20, 2014)
 "Black" (October 7, 2014)
 "Brother's Keeper" (May 20, 2015)
 "Out of the Darkness, Into the Fire" (October 7, 2015)

Being Human
 "There Goes the Neighborhood (Part 1)" (January 17, 2011)
 "There Goes the Neighborhood (Part 2)" (January 24, 2011)
 "Some Thing to Watch Over Me" (January 31, 2011)
 "It Takes Two to Make a Thing Go Wrong" (February 21, 2011)
 "I See Your True Colors... And That's Why I Hate You" (February 28, 2011)
 "Dog Eat Dog" (March 21, 2011)
 "A Funny Thing Happened on the Way to Me Killing You" (April 11, 2011)
 "Turn This Mother Out" (January 16, 2012)
 "Mama Said There'd Be Decades Like These" (February 20, 2012)
 "It's My Party and I'll Die If I Want To" (April 9, 2012)
 "It's a Shame About Ray" (January 14, 2013)

Frequency
 "Pilot" (October 5, 2016)
 "Signal and Noise" (October 12, 2016)
 "Signal Loss" (January 25, 2017)

Doom Patrol
 "Pilot" (February 15, 2019)
 "Ezekiel Patrol" (May 24, 2019)
 "Fun Size Patrol" (June 25, 2020)

Prodigal Son
 " The Trip" (October 21, 2019)

Filmography

Television
The numbers in writing credits refer to the number of episodes.

Trivia 
The Supernatural character Chuck Shurley's pen name "Carver Edlund" was named partially after Carver.

References

External links 

American television writers
American male television writers
American television producers
Place of birth missing (living people)
Year of birth missing (living people)
Living people